Rajesh P. N. Rao (born July 2, 1970 in Madras, India) is the Director of the NSF Center for Neurotechnology (CNT) and the Cherng Jia and Elizabeth Yun Hwang Professor of Computer Science and Engineering and Electrical and Computer Engineering at the University of Washington in Seattle.

He is a researcher in the fields of computational neuroscience, artificial intelligence, and brain-computer interfacing. With Dana Ballard, he proposed the predictive coding model of brain function in 1999. He has contributed to Bayesian models of perception and decision making. In brain-computer interfacing, Prof. Rao and his collaborators were the first to demonstrate direct brain control of a humanoid robot in 2007.

In the first demonstration of human brain-to-brain communication in August 2013, Rao wearing an electrical brain-signal reading cap triggered the movement of his colleague Andrea Stocco's hand via the Internet, allowing their brains to cooperate to solve a computer game. The demonstration was subsequently replicated across other pairs of humans and extended to other tasks and to a BrainNet for more than two brains. 

Rao also works on the decipherment of the Indus script. By comparing the entropy of the Indus script with entropies of linguistic scripts such as those for Sumerian and Old Tamil, and nonlinguistic sequences such as DNA and a programming language, his work suggested that the Indus script behaves more like a linguistic script than nonlinguistic sequences.
He has also given a TED talk on the same topic where he backed the Dravidian hypothesis put forward by Iravatham Mahadevan. 

Rao is the author of the book Brain-Computer Interfacing (Cambridge University Press, 2013) and the co-editor of two volumes, Probabilistic Models of the Brain (MIT Press, 2002) and Bayesian Brain (MIT Press, 2007). He has given a TEDx talk on "Brain co-processors: When AI meets the Brain." 

With Prof. Adrienne Fairhall, Rao offered the first massive open online course in computational neuroscience in 2013. The course continues to be offered on Coursera. 

Rao graduated summa cum laude from Angelo State University in 1992 with a B.S. in Computer Science and in Mathematics. He then attended the University of Rochester where he earned his M.S. (1994) and Ph.D. (1998) in Computer Science. He was a Sloan Postdoctoral Fellow at the Salk Institute for Biological Studies before joining the University of Washington faculty in 2000.

Awards
 Sloan Faculty Fellowship, 2001 
 Packard Fellowship for Science and Engineering, 2002 
 NSF CAREER Award 2002 
 ONR Young Investigator Award, 2003 
 Guggenheim Fellowship 2016

References

External links
 Home page and publications
 fusione mentale
 
 TED talk: A Rosetta Stone for a lost language (TED2011)
 TEDx talk: Brain Co-Processors: When AI Meets the Brain (TEDx Berkeley 2020)

University of Washington faculty
Angelo State University alumni
University of Rochester alumni
1970 births
Living people
Place of birth missing (living people)
American neuroscientists